A pink lake is a naturally-occurring geological feature, often caused by the presence of algae.

Pink Lake may also refer to:
Pink Lake (Canada), a lake in Gatineau Park, Quebec
 Pink Lake of Quairading, a lake at Badjaling, near Quairading, Western Australia
Pink Lake (Victoria), a lake near Dimboola in Victoria, Australia
Pink Lake (Western Australia), a lake in the Goldfields-Esperance region of Western Australia
Pink Lake, Western Australia, a suburb of Esperance, Western Australia